Shushpa (Şuşpa) is a rural locality (a village) in Nursky Selsoviet, Beloretsky District, Bashkortostan, Russia. The population was 43 as of 2010. There are 9 streets.

Geography 
Shushpa is located 16 km north of Beloretsk (the district's administrative centre) by road. Katayka is the nearest rural locality.

References 

Rural localities in Beloretsky District